The BlackBerry Quark (6210 / 6220 / 6230 / 6280) is a discontinued series of business-focused smartphones developed by Research In Motion. Launched in 2003, it was one of the most popular first-generation BlackBerry models.

It is the first BlackBerry device which can make calls without a headset attached.

Specification
The specification of devices in the series includes:

 ARM7EJ-S CPU: 32-bit, single-core (1999)
 2 MB SRAM
 16 MB flash
 160 x 100 monochrome LCD display
 USB (with Mass Storage Mode support)
 34-key QWERTY keyboard
 Built-in speakerphone
 SMS
 Lithium-ion rechargeable battery

Reception
Time magazine listed the BlackBerry Quark among its All-Time Top 100 Gadgets in 2010.

References

External links
 BlackBerry smartphones

Mobile phones with an integrated hardware keyboard
Quark